Odorrana schmackeri (common names: Schmacker's frog, piebald odorous frog, Kaochahien frog) is a species of frog in the family Ranidae. It is endemic to China and distributed in southern and south-central China. Reports from Thailand and Vietnam require confirmation.

Its natural habitats are streams of different sizes and the surrounding forests. It is considered as of "Least Concern" by the International Union for Conservation of Nature (IUCN), although habitat loss and exploitation are threats to this species.

References

schmackeri
Amphibians of China
Endemic fauna of China
Amphibians described in 1892
Taxa named by Oskar Boettger
Taxonomy articles created by Polbot